Filippo Alferio Ossorio (1634 – 24 February 1693) was a Roman Catholic prelate who served as Bishop of Fondi (1669–1693).

Biography
Filippo Alferio Ossorio was born in L'Aquila, Italy in 1634.
On 1 April 1669, he was appointed during the papacy of Pope Clement IX as Bishop of Fondi. 
On 7 April 1669, he was consecrated bishop by Francesco Maria Brancaccio, Cardinal-Bishop of Frascati, with Stefano Brancaccio, Titular Archbishop of Hadrianopolis in Haemimonto, and Emmanuele Brancaccio, Bishop of Ariano, serving as co-consecrators.
He served as Bishop of Fondi until his death on 24 February 1693.

References

17th-century Italian Roman Catholic bishops
Bishops appointed by Pope Clement IX
1634 births
1693 deaths